Nace Aquí (Spanish for "Born Here") is the eighth studio album recorded by Puerto Rican salsa singer Gilberto Santa Rosa released on August 6, 1993.

Track listing
This information adapted from Allmusic.

Chart performance

Certification

References

1993 albums
Gilberto Santa Rosa albums
Sony Discos albums